Kaalchilambu is a 2021 Indian Malayalam-language horror drama film directed by M. T. Annoor which was released after delayed for more than ten years. 
The film was released through Action Prime OTT Platform on 20 August 2021 as an Onam release.

Synopsis
How the love affair between Kannan, a Theyyam artiste from a lower caste, and Karthika, a woman who hails from an aristocratic family, results in banishment from society and a series of unfortunate incidents form the crux of the story.

Cast
 Vineeth
 Samvrutha Sunil
Sai Kumar
Madhupal
Narayanankutty
V. K. Sreeraman
Vidhya Mohan
Harish Siva
Sabitha Anand
Augustine
Kozhikode Narayanan Nair
Mala Aravindan

References

2008 films
2000s Malayalam-language films